Joan Takayama-Ogawa (born February 20, 1955) is a sansei (third-generation) Japanese-American ceramic artist and currently professor at Otis College of Art and Design in Los Angeles, California. Takayama-Ogawa's heritage since the 15th century of Japanese ceramic art influences her work, that usually explores beauty, decoration, ornamentation and narrative while also introducing a dialogue that rejects the traditional role of women in Japanese culture. Her most recent work addresses issues like climate change.

Early life and education 
Takayama-Ogawa began her extensive education at the International Christian University, Tokyo, when she was just 20 years old. While there, she spent a year studying conversational Japanese and with an intent in learning more about her family's connection with Japanese ceramics. Here she was first introduced to Jōmon pottery by faculty member and expert, J. E. Kidder, which was the beginning of her “life long interest in archeology and geology.” She continued on to receive her Bachelor of Fine Arts in East Asian studies and geography from UCLA in 1978. Then her Masters of Arts at the Stanford Graduate School of Education in 1979 and finally her ceramics education at Otis College of Art and Design, LA in 1989. At Otis, Ogawa studied with Ralph Bacerra, chair of Otis's ceramic department. His teaching focused on material proficiency over concept, his emphasis on form, surface and finish directly influenced Ogawa's stylistic choices in her early ceramic work.

Artist career and style 
When Ogawa signed up for ceramics classes one summer, around the time when she was working as the Academic Dean at Crossroads School in Santa Monica, she discovered that her newly found creative outlet also connected to her personal history. She was previously aware that her mother's family in Osaka had donated an extensive collection of Japanese ceramics to the Los Angeles County Museum of Art in the 1960s. Including works by ceramicists Kenkichi Tomimoto and Kenzan Ogata. But now she discovered that her father's family has a well known history of ceramic production in Tokoname, Japan dating back to the 15th century. Judy Seckler notes in Ceramics Monthly, “Recollecting the Past”, “This talent for claywork lay dormant in her genes until it was given a chance to bubble up to the surface and lay the groundwork for her new life as a clay artist.” Not too long after, she realized her urge to work with clay had “escalated into an obsession,” she left her middle-school teaching career to pursue a future in the ceramic arts.

Takayama-Ogawa's early works are often in the form of a teapot and tea bowls, referencing the important tradition of tea ceremonies in Japan. Although in Elaine Levin's Ceramics Monthly article, she mentions, alongside Keiko Fukazawa, that “Both artists admit that they have vigorously resisted the narrow, traditional role of women in Japanese culture, yet the teapot and the tea bowl of the tea ceremony—forms that have an important relation to ceramics tradition, and to women and culture in Japan—have had a significant impact on the work of both.”

Currently, Takayama-Ogawa's work focuses on climate change.   https://static1.squarespace.com/static/581e2b4946c3c40f061317ba/t/5a76a9d0f9619a31bd324bab/1517726160955/ClimateChange_Harvey.pdf  https://www.joantakayamaogawa.com/climate-change/

Teaching career 
After graduating from Stanford, Takayama-Ogawa started her first position in education at the Crossroads School in Santa Monica, CA in 1979, where she worked as faculty, as well as Academic Dean. until she decided to further her education at Otis College of Art and Design in 1985. That same year, she also transitioned to her current position at Otis as a Professor in Ceramics, Product Design, English and Public Speaking. In 2010, she was appointed Ceramics Coordinator, and she was in charge of “bringing clay back to Otis with a focus on 3D printing and clay”. Within that position in 2012, she has organized a corporate sponsored project with Gainey Ceramics, where students designed models to be manufactured and sold through Gainey. She has also organized three faculty development workshops for 2011 Clay in LA Symposium.

Recognition 
 2017		73 Scripps Annual Artist Curator, Scripps College, Claremont, CA
 2016		Pasadena Design Commissioner at AMOCA
 2016		NCECA Speaker
 2014		NCECA Speaker, Milwaukee and Kansas City
 2014		One of the top 50 American Ceramics Artists by The Marks Project
 2010		Otis College of Art and Design, Faculty Development Grant Laguna Clay Company, Lomitas, CA.
 2006		Recipient of the Otis Faculty Development Grant
                 Recipient of the Otis Faculty Technology Grant
 2005		Artist in Residency, Watershed, Maine
 2004		Teacher of the Year Commencement Speaker at Otis College of Art and Design
 1994		Glading McBean and Co., "Feats of Clay," Merit Award," Lincoln, California.
 1993		Renwick Gallery, Smithsonian Institution, "Workshop and Lecture Series," Washington D.C.
 1978		UCLA President's Undergraduate Fellowship, researched the history of Little Tokyo.

Permanent collections 
 Renwick Gallery, Smithsonian Institution, Washington, D.C.
 deYoung Museum, San Francisco
 Los Angeles County Museum of Art
 Oakland Museum of California
 Long Beach Museum of Art
 American Museum of Ceramic Art, Pomona, California
 Racine Art Museum
 World Ceramic Exposition Foundation, Icheon, South Korea
 Princessehof Leeuwarden Nationaal Keramiekmuseum, Leeuwarden, Netherlands
 George Ohr Museum, Biloxi, Mississippi
 Kamm Teapot Foundation
 David and Jackie Charak Foundation
 Hallmark Collection
 Celestial Seasoning Tea Company
 Newark Museum of Art, Newark, NY
 Stanford University Art Museum
 Flint Institute, Flint, Michigan

Further reading 
 American Craft Magazine. “Joan Takayama-Ogawa,” Portfolio, April/May 1996
 Clark, Garth. The Artful Teapot, Thames and Hudson, Great Britain. 2004
 Clayton, Peirce. 1998. The Clay Lover's Guide to Making Molds: Designing, Making, Using. 1st ed. Asheville, N.C;New York;: Lark Books.
 Ferrin, Leslie. 2000. Teapots Transformed: Exploration of an Object. Cincinnati, Ohio;Madison, Wis;: Guild Pub.
 Flint Institute of Arts.  Function, Form, and Fantasy: Ceramics from the Dr. Robert and   Deanna Harris Burger Collection, Tracee J. Glabb and Janet Koplos essays, 2016
 Lauria, Jo, Gretchen Adkins, Kemper Museum of Contemporary Art & Design, Los Angeles County Museum of Art, and Tucson Museum of Art. 2000. Color and Fire: Defining Moments in Studio Ceramics, 1950-2000. New York;Los Angeles; LACMA.
 Larry Wilson: Fired Up About Artists. 2007. Pasadena Star - News 2007.
 Lovelace, Joyce. "The Ubiquitous Teapot." American Craft 1994.
 Ostermann, Matthias. The Ceramic Surface. A & C Black Publishers Ltd. London, England.
 Ostermann, Matthias. Masters: Earthenware Major Works by Leading Artists, Lark     Books. New York. 2010.
 Perry, Sara. The Tea Book. Chronicle Books: San Francisco, California. 1993.
 Peterson, Susan. 2000. The craft and art of clay. 3rd ed. Woodstock, N.Y: The Overlook Press.
 Peterson, Susan. Contemporary Ceramics. Watson-Guptill Publications, New York.     2000
 Peterson, Susan. Smashing Glazes. GUILD.com, 2001
 Peterson, Susan. Working with Clay, Prentice Hall, Englewood Cliffs, New Jersey. 1998.
 Seckler, Judy. “Tea Time.” Pasadena Weekly. July 15, 1999. P.11
 Snyder, Jeffrey B. editor. Ceramics Today. Schiffer Publishing, Pennsylvania. 2010.
 The Artful Teapot 2002. Vol. 50. Columbus: American Ceramic Society.
 Triplett, Kathy. Handbuilt Ceramics. Lark Books, North Carolina. 1997.
 Watabe, Hiroko. "Joan Takayama-Ogawa: Japanese Inspired, American-Fired." Pronto. May 1990. ( in Japanese English translation available)

References

External links 
 Official Website
 Masters of Earthenware
  OTIS OSPACE



1955 births
American artists of Japanese descent
Living people
American ceramists
University of California, Los Angeles alumni
Otis College of Art and Design alumni
Otis College of Art and Design faculty